Michal Horák (born 10 September 1987) is a Czech judoka.

He is the bronze medallist of the 2016 Judo Grand Slam Abu Dhabi in the +100 kg category.

References

External links

 

1987 births
Living people
Czech male judoka